"Waiting for Tomorrow" is a song by Dutch DJ Martin Garrix and American DJ and musician Pierce Fulton. It features lead vocals from  singer Mike Shinoda, and uncredited production by fellow Linkin Park guitarist Brad Delson. It is released as the fifth and last track from Garrix's third EP, Bylaw, on October 19, 2018, via Stmpd, Epic Amsterdam and Sony Netherlands.

Background
First premiered at the 2016 Ultra Music Festival by Garrix during his headlining closing set, it was initially expected to be included in his unreleased debut studio album +x. Linkin Park has been reported as a feature for the album alongside deceased vocalist Chester Bennington, although Shinoda is the most frequent mention. In April 2018, during the Q&A session of the documentary film What We Started, Garrix spoke about the link with Linkin Park, he stated "'Waiting for Tomorrow' was together with Linkin Park, and because of Chester's passing, it's little bit hard to release the song. I don't know if we're ever gonna release it. I hope so, maybe one day. But not soon I think. We are working on it, but I don't know yet. There's a lot of new unreleased music which I'm gonna release very soon."

Track listing
Digital download

Charts

References

2018 songs
Martin Garrix songs
Songs written by Martin Garrix
Songs written by Mike Shinoda
Stmpd Rcrds singles
Songs written by Brad Delson